
Gmina Bodzanów is a rural gmina (administrative district) in Płock County, Masovian Voivodeship, in east-central Poland.

Villages
Gmina Bodzanów contains the villages and settlements of Archutówko, Archutowo, Białobrzegi, Bodzanów, Borowice, Chodkowo, Chodkowo-Działki, Cieśle, Cybulin, Felicjanów, Garwacz, Gąsewo, Gromice, Kanigowo, Karwowo Duchowne, Kępa Polska, Kłaczkowo, Krawieczyn, Łagiewniki, Leksyn, Łętowo, Mąkolin, Małoszewo, Małoszywka, Miszewko Garwackie, Miszewo Murowane, Niesłuchowo, Nowe Kanigowo, Nowe Miszewo, Nowy Reczyn, Osmolinek, Parkoczewo, Pepłowo, Ramutówko, Reczyn, Stanowo and Wiciejewo.

Neighbouring gminas
Gmina Bodzanów is bordered by the gminas of Bulkowo, Mała Wieś, Radzanowo, Słubice and Słupno.

References
Polish official population figures 2006

Bodzanow
Płock County